Enrico Toccacelo (born 14 December 1978 in Rome) is an Italian auto racer with karting, GT and Formula 3000 experience. He won three F3000 events and briefly led Vitantonio Liuzzi in the 2004 championship before Liuzzi went on to win the next three races. He finished runner-up, but, unable to land a Formula One seat, raced in the World Series by Renault series in 2005. From the 2005 Turkish Grand Prix he was the third driver with Minardi, appearing in Friday practice sessions for three Grand Prix weekends.

He raced in the inaugural season of A1 Grand Prix with A1 Team Italy, also appearing as a guest driver for A1 Team Pakistan after they were unable to find a driver at the South African round at Durban. In the second season of A1GP, Toccacelo was replaced by Alessandro Pier Guidi for the first two rounds, before appearing at the Beijing race, where he won the Feature race.

He is also racing in the World Series by Renault.

He was the driver of the A.S. Roma car in Superleague Formula for 2008 in rounds 1 to 3 and driver of rounds 4 to 5 for Borussia Dortmund.

Racing record

Career summary

Complete International Formula 3000 results
(key) (Races in bold indicate pole position) (Races in italics indicate fastest lap)

Complete Formula Renault 3.5 Series results 
(key) (Races in bold indicate pole position) (Races in italics indicate fastest lap)

† Driver did not finish the race, but was classified as he completed more than 90% of the race distance.

Complete Formula One participations
(key)

Complete Superleague Formula results
(key)
(Races in bold indicate pole position) (Races in italics indicate fastest lap)

Career results

Complete A1 Grand Prix results
(key) (Races in bold indicate pole position) (Races in italics indicate fastest lap)

† Guest driver for Team Pakistan

*(1) = Team standings.

References

Driver database Profile

1978 births
Living people
Racing drivers from Rome
Italian racing drivers
A1 Team Italy drivers
A1 Team Pakistan drivers
German Formula Three Championship drivers
Italian Formula Three Championship drivers
Superleague Formula drivers
International Formula 3000 drivers
World Series Formula V8 3.5 drivers
European Touring Car Championship drivers
24 Hours of Spa drivers
Prema Powerteam drivers
Aston Martin Racing drivers
FIA GT Championship drivers
Scuderia Coloni drivers
Team Astromega drivers
Victory Engineering drivers
EuroInternational drivers
A1 Grand Prix drivers
Super Nova Racing drivers
RC Motorsport drivers